Helen Ruth Saibil FRS FMedSci (born August 12, 1950) is a Canadian-British molecular biologist and Professor of Structural Biology at the Department of Crystallography of Birkbeck, University of London. Her research is largely focuses on molecular chaperones and protein misfolding.

Saibil completed undergraduate studies at McGill University in 1971 followed by a PhD at King's College London, receiving her thesis in 1977 entitled Diffraction studies of retinal rod outer segment membranes.  Saibil went on to work at CEA Grenoble and the University of Oxford. Saibil has been at Birkbeck since 1989, and was elected to the Royal Society in 2006 and the Academy of Medical Sciences in 2009.

References

British molecular biologists
McGill University alumni
Alumni of King's College London
Academics of Birkbeck, University of London
Academics of the University of Oxford
Female Fellows of the Royal Society
Living people
1950 births
Fellows of the Academy of Medical Sciences (United Kingdom)
Fellows of the Royal Society
Canadian Fellows of the Royal Society